This is a list of earthquakes in 2001. Only earthquakes of magnitude 6 or above are included, unless they result in damage and/or casualties, or are notable for some other reason.  All dates are listed according to UTC time.

Compared to other years

Overall

By death toll

 Note: At least 10 casualties

By magnitude

 Note: At least 7.0 magnitude

By month

January 

Most of the casualties and some of the damage were caused by landslides.
Many aftershocks were affected.

February 

It is an aftershock of the 2001 Gujarat earthquake. Additional damage was caused, and 40 people were injured.
One person died.
Several people were injured and many buildings were damaged in the city of Dien Bien Phu, in neighboring Vietnam.
At least three people were killed.
One person was killed and 400 were injured.

March 

 A magnitude 6.0 struck offshore Valparaiso, on March 15 at a depth of .This came just 12 hours after India event.
 A magnitude 6.8 struck Hiroshima, on March 28 at a depth of .2 people were killed and 161 were injured

April 

At least eight people were injured, furniture were overturned, and waterpipes and windows were broken in Shizuoka.
 A magnitude 6.0 struck Solomon Islands, on April 19 at a depth of .This is the foreshock of magnitude 6.7
 A magnitude 6.2 struck Solomon Islands, on April 19 at a depth of .This is the foreshock of magnitude 6.7

May 

 A magnitude 5.7 struck El Salvador, on May 8 at a depth of .Killing one people.
 A magnitude 5.5 struck western Sichuan, on May 23 at a depth of .Killing two people.

June 

 A magnitude 5.0 struck Hindu Kush, on June 1 at a depth of .Killing 4 people.
 A magnitude 6.0 struck eastern New Guinea, on June 5 at a depth of .This is aftershock of magnitude 6.4.
 A magnitude 4.2 struck Germany, on June 21 at a depth of .Killing one people.
At least 145 people were killed.
 A magnitude 6.1 struck southern Peru, on June 23 at a depth of .This is aftershock of the magnitude 8.4.
 A magnitude 6.7 struck southern Peru, on June 26 at a depth of .This is aftershock of the magnitude 8.4.

July 

 A magnitude 6.6 struck southern Peru, on July 5 at a depth of .This is aftershock of magnitude 8.4
 A magnitude 7.6 struck southern Peru, on July 7 at a depth of .This is aftershock of magnitude 8.4.Killing one people.
 A magnitude 4.7 struck northern Italy, on July 17 at a depth of .Killing 4 people.

August 

 A magnitude 5.8 struck central Peru, on August 9 at a depth of .Killing 4 people

September 

October 

 A magnitude 5.6 struck Yunnan, on October 27 at a depth of .Killing one person.

November 

 A magnitude 7.8 struck Qinghai, on November 14 at a depth of .Some damage was reported, but no casualties.

December 

Two people were killed.

References

2001
 
2001 natural disasters
2001